Filip Vujanović (Montenegrin Cyrillic: , ; born 1 September 1954) is a Montenegrin politician who served as the President of Montenegro from 2003 to 2018.

Early life and career
Born and raised in Belgrade, Vujanović graduated from the University of Belgrade's Law School. Between 1978 and 1981 he worked in one of the city's Municipal Courts, and later also as an assistant at the Belgrade District Court. In 1981, aged 27, he moved to Titograd. Following a short stint as secretary at Titograd's District Court, he worked as a lawyer until entering politics in March 1993.

Career in politics
Vujanović joined the Democratic Party of Socialists (DPS) in 1993 upon the invitation of Montenegrin federal President Momir Bulatović following the creation of the Federal Republic of Yugoslavia (comprising Montenegro and Serbia) in the wake of the break-up of the previous Yugoslavia.

He was Minister of Justice in Milo Đukanović's pro-Slobodan Milošević government (1993–1996), and then Interior Minister from 1996 to 1998 after Đukanović switched loyalty and turned against Milošević. During the 1997 DPS leadership conflict, Vujanović initially declared neutrality. He eventually sided with Milo Đukanović after Đukanović won the presidential election. Đukanović then appointed Vujanović as the first Prime Minister of Montenegro; Vujanović served in that post from 5 February 1998 until 8 January 2003.

President of Montenegro
On 5 November 2002, he became speaker of the Montenegrin parliament, a position which, from 25 November 2002, made him Acting President of Montenegro due to the resignation of Đukanović from the presidency to prepare to switch office with Vujanović. Vujanović ran in the December 2002 presidential elections and won a landslide victory, receiving 86% of the vote, but the election was ruled invalid because turnout was less than 50%. The elections were held again in February 2003, with Vujanović winning 81% of the vote, but again turnout was below 50%. The elections were held for a third time on 11 May 2003, with the minimum turnout rule abolished, and Vujanović won again with 63% of the vote.

Vujanović resigned from his positions as speaker and acting president on 19 May 2003 but became president of Montenegro again three days later when his term began. Even though he was born Serbia, he was one of the most prominent Montenegrin secessionists. As president of Montenegro, Vujanović was a supporter of the Montenegro independence referendum, though Prime Minister Đukanović was much more high-profile in his campaign for it. Vujanović's messages often focus on Montenegro's and Serbia's ability to have a peaceful separation and post-independence cooperation, and he is friends with former Serbian president Boris Tadić. On 21 May 2006, an independence referendum was held in Montenegro; it was approved by 55.5% of voters, narrowly passing the 55% threshold. On 3 June 2006, Montenegro became an independent state.

On 14 December 2006, he signed the Framework Document for the accession to the Partnership for Peace Programme, wherewith Montenegro became a member of the NATO program "Partnership for Peace". During the press conference that President Vujanovic and Secretary General of NATO, Jaap de Hoop Scheffer held after signing the Partnership for Peace Framework Document, Scheffer welcomed the way Montenegro decided to go towards the European integrations.

In April 2007, President Vujanović declared he would protect the property of the main religious institution in Montenegro, the Serbian Orthodox Church during an attempt of the non-canonical Montenegrin Orthodox Church to forcibly seize its property. At the 2008 presidential election, Vujanović ran for the second presidential term, and secured another five years in office in the first election round, with 51.89% vote. The turnout was 68.2%.

On 20 January 2012, Vujanović adopted the Decision on Calling Elections for the MPs of the local Parliament of Tivat and local Parliament of Herceg Novi. On 28 March 2012, Vujanović, after carrying out consultations with the Bar Association of Montenegro, Association of Judges of Montenegro, Law faculties, Academy of Sciences, Extended Session of the Supreme Court of Montenegro, appointed four members of the Judicial Council, that were judges of the Constitutional Court of Montenegro.

On July 31, 2012, President Vujanović passed a Decision on Calling Elections for Members of the Parliament of Montenegro. The parliamentary elections were held on October 14 and were won by the Coalition for European Montenegro, dominated by DPS. Following the elections, on December 4, 2012, Vujanović destined Đukanović as Prime Minister.

In February 2013, the Constitutional Court officially approved Vujanović's candidacy for a new term, noting that for his 2003–2008 term he was elected as President of the Republic of Montenegro as a constituent entity within its state union with Serbia and served as de facto independent head of state only in 2006–2008, meaning that his 2008–2013 term is legally his first term. At the 2013 presidential election Vujanović won the election for third presidential term, with 51.2% of the vote against the Democratic Front opposition alliance nominee, Miodrag Lekić.

Foreign policy

On 5 December 2012, Vujanović hosted the 4th Regional Summit of the Heads of States, held in Budva. On 13 June 2013, Vujanović was participating in the 18th Summit of the Heads of States of the Central European Countries, held in Bratislava.

Serbia
Vujanović, as president of Montenegro, recognized the independence of Kosovo, a Serbian autonomous province. In October 2008, Serbian government expelled Anka Vojvodić, the ambassador of Montenegro to Belgrade. Almost one year later, Serbia finally accepted Igor Jovović to take on the role of the new Montenegrin ambassador.

After being elected the new Serbian president in May 2012, Tomislav Nikolić gave an interview to Televizija Crne Gore, during which he stated that he recognize Montenegro like a state, "but not any difference between Serbs and Montenegrins, because there is none". On 13 June 2013, Vujanović meet Nikolić in Bratislava, pointing out that he "supported the activities of the two Governments aimed at joint projects and interests, with a special emphasis on the infrastructural projects".

Romania
On 24 June 2013, Vujanović received Titus Corlățean, Romanian Minister of Foreign Affairs, who came to Montenegro with the occasion of the Romanian bus crash. He reiterated the deepest condolences in its own name and on behalf of the citizens of Montenegro. He also sent the telegram of condolences to the Romania's President, Traian Băsescu, over that accident in which 18 tourists from Romania lost their lives. 26 June, the day when the victims were repatriated, became a day of national mourning in solidarity with Romania.

Timeline 

The chart below shows a timeline of the offices held by Vujanović and the Montenegro status. The left bar shows president and all prime ministers terms of Vujanović, and the right bar shows the country status of Montenegro at that time.

Personal life

Since May 1985, he has been married to Svetlana, court judge, with whom he has three children: two daughters (Tatjana and Nina), and a son (Danilo). Vujanović stands  in height making him among the tallest statesmen in the world.

Note

References

External links

 Filip Vujanovic wins Presidential Election in Montenegro

|-

|-

1954 births
Democratic Party of Socialists of Montenegro politicians
Living people
Presidents of Montenegro
University of Belgrade Faculty of Law alumni
Politicians from Belgrade
Montenegrin people of Serbian descent
Interior ministers of Montenegro
Justice ministers of Montenegro